The Always Open Mouth is the third full-length album by the post-hardcore band Fear Before the March of Flames, released in September 2006.

Critical reception
Drowned in Sound called the album "a complex and matured experimental punk record that is both ravishingly beautiful and jaw-droppingly massive in one fouler-than-foul swoop." PopMatters wrote that "although a valiant effort, The Always Open Mouth is, more or less, an amalgam of separate ideas, none of which seem to pan out."

Track listing

Personnel
Brandon L. Proff - drums, percussion, programming and gangs
Michael L. Madruga - bass guitar, percussion and gangs
David M. Marion - vocals
Adam R. Fisher - guitar, keyboards, piano, vocals, programming and percussion
Zachary M. Hutchings - guitars, percussion and gangs

Additional personnel
Anthony Green - additional vocals on track 11
Jeremy Fisher - additional vocals on track seven
Ryan Smith (Sterling Sound) - mastering
Bobby Darling - producer
Casey Bates - engineering and mixing
Brandon L. Proff - layout and design

References

External links
Official Website
Directions on opening the cd to obtain the second booklet

Fear Before albums
Equal Vision Records albums
2006 albums